The 2007 edition of the Copa Sudamericana was played by 34 teams; 30 teams from the CONMEBOL and 4 teams from the CONCACAF. CONMEBOL organized the tournament and invited three North American clubs which were the best three of the CONCACAF Champions' Cup 2007; the fourth North American club was the defending champion Pachuca. The official draw took place on May 22 in Buenos Aires.

The Argentine club Arsenal de Sarandí won their first international title by defeating América in the final, winning 3-2 in the first leg and losing 2-1 in the second leg, which was the only game that they lost. Arsenal scored at least three goals in their opponents stadium in four of the five games they played. They defeated San Lorenzo, an Argentine club that recently won the 2007 Clausura, the Brazilian club Goiás, Argentine giant River Plate and the strongest rivals of Mexican football, Guadalajara and America.

This is the third time a Mexican club has reached the final, and the fourth title for Argentine clubs in the competition. Arsenal became only the third Argentine club to win a major international tournament without winning the Argentine league first, after Lanús and Talleres de Córdoba. They were also the first Argentine club other than Boca Juniors to win an international title since San Lorenzo won the Copa Sudamericana 2002.

Qualified teams
The Copa Sudamericana 2007 tournament was the seventh edition of the Copa Sudamericana soccer tournament.

Fixture Dates
Preliminary Rounds: Between July 31 and September 6
Round of 16: Between September 11 and October 4
Quarterfinals: Between October 9 and November 1
Semifinals: Between November 6 and November 15
Finals: Between November 28 and December 5
Full Schedule

First stage
The table gives the teams in the first round gathered in elimination groups of 2 teams or 4 teams. Teams hosting the first game are on the left. Advancing teams are in bold.

|-
!colspan="5"|Chile/Bolivia Preliminary

|-
!colspan="5"|Venezuela/Ecuador Preliminary

|-
!colspan="5"|Colombia/Perú Preliminary

|-
!colspan="5"|Paraguay/Uruguay Preliminary

|}

Second stage

|-

|-

|-

|-

|-

|-

|-

|-

|-

|-

|}

Final stages

Bracket
To prevent a final with two teams from the same country, CONMEBOL paired Arsenal with River Plate in the semifinals, thus reordering the bracket.

References

 
2
2007
2007 in American soccer
2007–08 in Mexican football